The Blériot-SPAD S.71 was a French fighter aircraft developed in the early 1920s.

Design and development
The S.71 was a single-seat fighter plane of all-wood construction with jointed fabric.

Specifications

References

Bibliography

Fighter aircraft
Biplanes
1920s French fighter aircraft
S.71
Single-engined tractor aircraft
Aircraft first flown in 1923